100% Live is a live album by American metal band Prong. It was recorded at the Double Door, in Chicago, and at the Royal Oak Theater in Detroit.

Track listing

Personnel 
 Tommy Victor – vocals, guitar
 Monte Pittman – guitar
 Brian Perry – bass
 Dan Laudo – drums

References

Prong (band) live albums
Locomotive Music live albums
Albums produced by Tommy Victor
2002 live albums